The Eastern Allamakee  Community School District is a public school district based in the city of Lansing, Iowa.

The district is completely within in Allamakee County. It serves the city of Lansing, and the surrounding rural areas.

List of Schools
The district operates three schools:
New Albin Elementary School
Lansing Middle School
Kee High School

References

External links

See also
List of school districts in Iowa

School districts in Iowa
Education in Allamakee County, Iowa